This page lists books about mafia organizations all over the world:

Cosa Nostra

Mafia
 
 
 
 
 
 
 
 
 
 
 
 
 Pickering-Iazzi, Robin. (2015). The Mafia in Italian Lives and Literature: Life Sentences and Their Geographies. University of Toronto Press. 978-1-4426-2908-0.

See also

References

External links
 Bibliography - The Italian Mafia During Prohibition

Mafia